Aliabad Rural District is a rural district (dehestan) in Khafr County, Fars Province, Iran. At the 2006 census, its population was 7,138, in 1,796 families.  The rural district has 13 villages.

References 

Rural Districts of Fars Province
Jahrom County